Gat or Gát is a surname that may refer to 
 Azar Gat (born 1959), an Israeli researcher and author on military history
 Eliahu Gat (1919–1987), an Israeli landscape painter
 Emanuel Gat (born 1969), an Israeli choreographer of contemporary dance
 György Gát (born 1947), a Hungarian television director and producer
 Johnny Gat, a major character in the Saints Row video game series
 Yonatan Gat (born 1982), Israeli guitarist, composer and improviser